The 2016 World Sprint Speed Skating Championships was held in Seoul, South Korea, from 27 to 28 February 2016.

Schedule

All times are local (UTC+9).

Medal summary

Medal table

Medalists

Participating nations
60 speed skaters from 17 nations participated. The number of speed skaters per nation that competed is shown in parentheses.

References

External links
Official website
ISU website

 
World Sprint Championships
2016 in South Korean sport
2016 Sprint
2016 World Sprint Speed Skating Championships
2016 World Sprint Speed Skating Championships
February 2016 sports events in South Korea
2010s in Seoul
2016 in South Korea